JCET may refer to:
 JCET (company)
 Joint Combined Exchange Training